Snoops is an American crime themed comedy-drama television series which aired for one season (13 episodes) from September 22, 1989 to July 6, 1990 on CBS. The series was created and executive produced by series star Tim Reid and Sam Egan.

Synopsis
The series centers around a criminologist and his wife and the comedic situations in which they found themselves embroiled in solving various crimes. The show starred real-life married couple Tim Reid and Daphne Maxwell Reid as well as child actress Tasha Scott.

Cast
 Tim Reid as Chance Dennis, Jr. 
 Daphne Maxwell Reid as Micki Dennis
 Tasha Scott as Katja Dennis, Chance's daughter from a previous marriage 
 Tracy Camilla Johns as Yolanda
 John Karlen as Lieutenant Sam Akers, a lieutenant with the Washington, D.C. Police Department 
 Troy Curvey, Jr as Hugo
 Tim Reid II as Jason
 Adam Silbar as Doug
 Lynn Whitfield as Denise Kendall, Chance's sister 
 Raymond St. Jacques and Barbara McNair as General Ben and Virginia Martin, Chance's parents

Episode list

External links

1989 American television series debuts
1990 American television series endings
1980s American comedy-drama television series
1990s American comedy-drama television series
1980s American crime drama television series
1990s American crime drama television series
1980s American police comedy television series
1990s American police comedy television series
Television series by CBS Studios
CBS original programming
English-language television shows
Television shows set in Washington, D.C.